Kar Kondeh (also Romanized as Kār Kondeh and Kār Kandeh) is a village in Anzan-e Sharqi Rural District, in the Central District of Bandar-e Gaz County, Golestan Province, Iran. At the 2006 census, its population was 1,088, in 273 families.

References 

Populated places in Bandar-e Gaz County